The Jugendbund Neudeutschland (Youth Federation New Germany) is a German Catholic organization, founded in 1919 following a recommendation by Felix von Hartmann, the Archbishop of Cologne. During the Weimar Republic, it  was closely affiliated with the Catholic Centre Party. The organisation opposed Nazism and was banned by the Nazi regime in 1933. After World War II, it was re-established as Bund Neudeutschland and enlarged, comprising a wing for secondary school students, another for university students, and a third one for those who were no longer students, but wished to continue in the movement.

Former members
Hans Filbinger, a leading member of Jugendbund Neudeutschland in Baden in the early 1930s
 Bernhard Vogel (politician)

References

 Ronald Warlowski: Neudeutschland German Catholic Students 1919-1939. Nijhoff, Den Haag 197

Historical youth organisations based in Germany
Youth organizations established in 1919
1933 disestablishments in Germany
Historical youth wings of political parties in Germany
1919 establishments in Germany